Fort Holabird was a United States Army post in the city of Baltimore, Maryland, active from 1918 to 1973.

History
Fort Holabird was located in the southeast corner of Baltimore and northwest of the suburban developments of Dundalk, Maryland, in surrounding Baltimore County, fronting on Holabird Avenue between Broening Highway and Dundalk Avenue. From 1941 until the end of World War II, the military installation grew to include approximately 350 acres and 286 buildings. After the Second World War, activities at Fort Holabird were curtailed and portions of the property were transferred from the Army. The largest land transfers occurred in the timeframe over three decades later following the Vietnam War, between 1977 and 1979, when 223 acres were transferred to the city of Baltimore. The city later developed the land in succeeding years into the Fort Holabird Industrial Park.

Timeline
1918: Established as Camp Holabird on 96 acres of marsh near Colgate Creek. Established as the U.S. Army's first motor transport training center and depot in southeastern Baltimore. It was named for Army Quartermaster General and West Point graduate Samuel B. Holabird (1826-1907).
1918: During World War I, Holabird supplied the American Expeditionary Forces in France with Detroit-made vehicles. Thousands of military personnel were trained there to drive and repair automobiles and trucks.
1918 or after: Became home to the Holabird Quartermaster Depot.
2 July 1919: U.S. Navy blimp C-8 explodes while landing at Camp Holabird, injuring about 80 adults and children who were watching. Windows in homes a mile away are broken by the blast.
1920: by 1920 a center for the research and development of military vehicles was established at Holabird. Here the now-famous Jeep was tested and refined. 
1940: Listed as Holabird Quartermaster Depot on the 1940 U.S. Census.
1942: Renamed as Holabird Ordnance Depot.
1943: Renamed as Holabird Signal Depot.
1947: Renamed as Camp Holabird.
1950: Renamed as Fort Holabird. The U.S. Army Intelligence School and Counter Intelligence Records Facility based here until transferred to Fort Huachuca, Arizona in 1972. It was also used as an Armed Forces Examining & Entrance Station (induction facility).
Early 1970s: Due to its proximity to Washington, D.C., Ft. Holabird was used to guard witnesses in major federal cases, such as the Watergate hearings. E. Howard Hunt, Charles Colson and John Dean were among the Watergate witnesses held there.
1973: Closed, area has been redeveloped into an industrial park.
2001: Fire destroys remnants of former spy school.

Notable people trained or stationed at Ft. Holabird

Zine El Abidine Ben Ali, former President of Tunisia
Donald L. Barlett, author and investigative journalist
Stephen Barnett, law profession and legal scholar
Stephen Breyer, associate justice of the Supreme Court of United States
C. D. B. Bryan, author and journalist
Boniface Campbell, U.S. Army major general
Roger Christie, ordained minister in the Religion of Jesus Church
Garrison B. Coverdale, U.S. Army major general 
Thomas J. Dodd Jr., U.S. Ambassador to Uruguay and Costa Rica
Oliver W. Dillard, U.S. Army major general
Mike Gravel, U.S. senator from Alaska, 1969-81
W. E. B. Griffin, novelist
Chic Hecht, U.S. senator from Nevada 1983-89
Dennis F. Hightower, former Deputy Secretary, U.S. Department of Commerce
Clint Hill, Secret Service agent
Patrick M. Hughes, former director of the Defense Intelligence Agency
Thomas Charles Huston, author of the Huston Plan
Eli Jacobs, financier and attorney, owner of the Baltimore Orioles from 1989 to 1993
Morton Kondracke, political commentator and journalist
Ann M. McDonough, first woman member of the U.S. Army Counter Intelligence Corps
George J. Mitchell, U.S. senator from Maine, 1980-95
Ben Moses, filmmaker and documentarian
Robert H. Pepper, U.S. Marines Corps lieutenant general
McCandlish Phillips, journalist and author
J. D. Salinger, author
Douglas L. Turner, former Washington Bureau Chief of The Buffalo News
Humbert Roque Versace, U.S. Army officer who received the Medal of Honor
George J. Walker, U.S. Army brigadier general and former Deputy Commanding General of INSCOM

Gallery

See also
Counterintelligence Corps
Fort Howard, Maryland, interrogation training
P. O. Box 1142, WWII military intelligence facility
Karl Probst, designer of the first jeep prototypes
United States Army Counterintelligence
United States Army Intelligence Center

References

External links

Camp Holabird, from "On the Trail of Jeep History"
1919 Letter from a man in Camp Holabird
1928 article, "The Holabird Quartermaster Depot"
"The Army Intelligence Center is Established 1 September 1954"
" Congressional hearing on the relocation of The U.S. Army Intelligence School from Fort Holabird to Fort Huachuca, May 10, 1972

Military intelligence
Closed installations of the United States Army
Holobird
History of Baltimore
1973 disestablishments in Maryland